Wavertree is a district of Liverpool, England. It is a ward of Liverpool City Council, and its population at the 2011 census was 14,772. Located to the south and east of the city centre, it is bordered by various districts and suburbs such as Childwall, Edge Hill, Fairfield, Mossley Hill, Old Swan, and Toxteth.

History

The name derives from the Old English words wæfre and treow, meaning "wavering tree", possibly in reference to aspen trees common locally.
It has also been variously described as "a clearing in a wood" or "the place by the common pond". In the past, the name has been spelt Watry, Wartre, Waurtree, Wavertre and Wavertree. The earliest settlement of Wavertree is attested to by the discovery of Bronze Age burial urns in Victoria Park in the mid −1860s  while digging the footings for houses, two of which were built for Patrick O Connor, patentee, ironmonger, merchant and Chair to the Wavertree Local Board of Health.

The Domesday Book reference is "Leving held Wauretreu. There are 2 carucates of land. It was worth 64 pence". Wavertree was part of the parish of Childwall in the West Derby hundred.

Wavertree also boasts a village lock-up, commonly known as The Roundhouse, despite being octagonal in shape. Built in 1796, and later modified by prominent local resident and architect Sir James Picton, it was once used to detain local drunks. The lock-up was made a listed building in 1952. 
A similar structure, Everton Lock-Up sometimes called Prince Rupert's Tower, survives in Everton. The village green, on which Wavertree's lock-up was built, is officially the only surviving piece of common land in Liverpool.

In 1895, the village of Wavertree was incorporated into the city of Liverpool. Buildings of interest include Holy Trinity Church, Liverpool Reform Synagogue, the Blue Coat School, and the Royal School for the Blind, all of which are situated on the same road. King David High School, a Jewish-affiliated school that also accepts students of other faiths and backgrounds, is situated in Wavertree and has a primary school attached to it. Wavertree Town Hall was built in 1872 as the headquarters of the Wavertree Local Board of Health. Rescued from demolition in 1979, the town hall is now a restaurant.

Wavertree is one of the areas in south Liverpool populated by students of Liverpool's three universities, especially the Smithdown Road area. This road is known for "The Smithdown Ten" pub crawl, although the number of pubs in business varies from year to year. Wavertree is also home to the annual Smithdown Road Festival, with local bars and cafes hosting almost 200 bands every year. The community is ethnically diverse, with significant South Asian and black populations.

Governance
The elected councillors for Wavertree are Angela Coleman, Clare McIntyre and Dave Cummings, all of whom are members of the Labour Party. It has been represented since 2019 by Paula Barker, also of the Labour Party, in the parliamentary constituency of Liverpool Wavertree.

Education
There are a number of both primary and secondary schools in this densely populated area of Liverpool. In addition to the aforementioned Blue Coat School, Royal School for the Blind, and King David High School, there is also Wavertree Church of England School, which was renamed from Trinity District in the 1990s. The school celebrated its 150th birthday in September 2017. There is another primary school on South Drive called Our Lady of Good Help. This used to be located in Chestnut Grove next to our Lady's Roman Catholic Church, which is now facing re-development. St Clare's Roman Catholic Primary School is also situated off Smithdown Road.

Wavertree Playground (The Mystery)

Wavertree Playground, known locally as The Mystery, was one of the first purpose-built public playgrounds in the UK. Opened in 1895, it is based on land donated to Liverpool Corporation by an anonymous donor (hence its nickname) to be a venue for organised sports, and a place for children from the city's schools to run about in, not a park for "promenading" in the Victorian tradition. The donor expressed the hope that the City Council "might approve of giving it a fair trial for this purpose ... before appropriating it for any other use".

The land is currently home to Wavertree Athletics Centre, which boasts many sports facilities including tennis courts, an all-weather pitch, a bowling green, and an athletic track with grandstand. It also houses Liverpool Aquatics Centre, with two swimming pools, a sports hall, and a lifestyles fitness centre. The athletics centre has produced Olympic athletes such as Katarina Johnson-Thompson, who trains with the Liverpool Harriers team that has made its headquarters at the centre since 1990.

Notable current or former residents

Ross Barkley, footballer
Tony Bellew, boxer
Joan Benesh, choreographer and dancer
Augustine Birrell, barrister, politician, and writer
Kim Cattrall, actress
Kenneth Cope, actor
Paul Dawber, actor
Paul Draper, musician
Georgia May Foote, actress
Cyril Edward Gourley, soldier
John Gregson, actor
Chelcee Grimes, singer and songwriter
George Harrison, musician
Stewart Duckworth Headlam, priest
Holly Johnson, singer
Bill Kenwright, theatre director
John Lennon, musician
Norman Rossington, actor
Leonard Rossiter, actor
Bertram Peel, cricketer
Denis Peel, cricketer
Jimmy Tarbuck, comedian 
James Valiant, cricketer
Dora Yates, linguist, Romani scholar, lived in Marmion Road

Transport
Wavertree Technology Park railway station

References

External links

 Wavertree Today
 Liverpool City Council, Ward Profile: Wavertree
 The History of Holy Trinity Wavertree
 Liverpool Street Gallery – Liverpool 15
 wavertree.org.uk – Photo Mapping the history of L15
 Smithdown Ten Pub Crawl

Areas of Liverpool